In classical Greek and Roman mythology, Abarbarea (Ancient Greek: Ἀβαρβαρέη) is the name of two nymphs:
 Abarbarea, naiad wife of Bucolion.
 Abarbarea, naiad ancestor of the Tyrians.
Other writers do not mention this nymph, but Hesychius mentions "Abarbareai" (Ἀβαρβαρέαι) or "Abarbalaiai" (Ἀβαρβαλαια) as the name of a class of nymphs.

Notes

References 

 Bell, Robert E., Women of Classical Mythology: A Biographical Dictionary. ABC-Clio. 1991. .
Homer, The Iliad with an English Translation by A.T. Murray, Ph.D. in two volumes. Cambridge, MA., Harvard University Press; London, William Heinemann, Ltd. 1924. . Online version at the Perseus Digital Library.
Homer, Homeri Opera in five volumes. Oxford, Oxford University Press. 1920. . Greek text available at the Perseus Digital Library.
 Nonnus of Panopolis, Dionysiaca translated by William Henry Denham Rouse (1863-1950), from the Loeb Classical Library, Cambridge, MA, Harvard University Press, 1940.  Online version at the Topos Text Project.
 Nonnus of Panopolis, Dionysiaca. 3 Vols. W.H.D. Rouse. Cambridge, MA., Harvard University Press; London, William Heinemann, Ltd. 1940-1942. Greek text available at the Perseus Digital Library.

Naiads